Wimille is a commune in the Pas-de-Calais department in the Hauts-de-France region of France.

Geography
The river Slack forms the northern boundary of the commune. Junction 33 of the A16 autoroute with the D242 is within the commune's territory. Wimille-Wimereux station has rail connections to Calais and Boulogne-sur-Mer.

Population

The inhabitants are called Wimillois.

Places of interest
 The Column of the Grande Armée, also known as Napoleon’s column.
 The church of St. Pierre, dating from the twelfth century.
 A sixteenth century chapel.
 A seventeenth century drinking fountain.
 The château de La Rivière, dating from the seventeenth century.
 Four other châteaux: Lozembrune, Petit-Denacre, Grisendal and Billeauville, all dating from the eighteenth century.
 The Terlincthun British Cemetery, created during the Great War

Notable people
Cecil Chesterton, journalist, buried at the Terlincthun British Cemetery
 Jean-François Pilâtre de Rozier, aviation pioneer, took off in a balloon here.

See also
 Communes of the Pas-de-Calais department

References

External links

 Official website of Wimille 
 The Terlincthun British Cemetery, on the website "Remembrance Trails of the Great War in Northern France"

Communes of Pas-de-Calais